In computing, a login session is the period of activity between a user logging in and logging out of a (multi-user) system.

On Unix and Unix-like operating systems, a login session takes one of two main forms:
 When a textual user interface is used, a login session is represented as a kernel session — a collection of process groups with the logout action manage

On Windows NT-based systems, login sessions are maintained by the kernel and control of them is within the purview of the Local Security Authority Subsystem Service (LSA). winlogon responds to the secure attention key, it requests the LSA to create login sessions on login, and terminates all of the processes belonging to a login session on logout.

See also
 Windows NT Startup Process
 Architecture of the Windows NT operating system line
 Booting
 Master boot record
 Power-on self test
 Windows Vista Startup Process
 BootVis

Further reading
 

Operating system technology